Harvey Jay Cartwright (born 9 May 2002) is an English professional footballer who plays as a goalkeeper for  club Wycombe Wanderers, on loan from EFL Championship club Hull City.

Career
Cartwright is a youth product of Hull City, having joined at U13 level. He had a short loan with Barton Town in 2019, with 10 appearances for the club. Returning to Hull City, he made his first senior appearance with the club in a 2–1 EFL Trophy loss to Leicester City U21s in September 2020. He then joined Gainsborough Trinity on a one-month loan in the Northern Premier League, keeping four clean sheets in 6 undefeated outings with the club. 

He signed his first professional contract with Hull City on 2 February 2021. He made his professional debut with Hull City in a 1–1 EFL Championship tie with Queens Park Rangers on 19 February 2022, coming on as a substitute in the 66th minute after a horror injury to the starting goalkeeper Matt Ingram.

On 25 May 2022, Cartwright signed a four-year contract with Hull City.

On 17 June 2022, Cartwright agreed a season-long loan deal for the 2022–23 season with Peterborough United under former Hull City manager Grant McCann. On 16 January 2023, Cartwright's loan at Peterborough United was cut short.

On 26 January 2023, Cartwright joined Wycombe Wanderers on loan until the end of the 2022–23 season.

International career
Cartwright is a youth international for England, having played for the England U18 in a friendly 3–2 win over the Austria U18s on 16 October 2019, coming on as a sub at half-time.

On 25 March 2022, Cartwright made his U20 debut in a 2–0 defeat to Poland in Bielsko-Biała.

Career statistics

References

External links
 

2002 births
Living people
Footballers from Grimsby
English footballers
England youth international footballers
Hull City A.F.C. players
Barton Town F.C. players
Gainsborough Trinity F.C. players
Peterborough United F.C. players
Wycombe Wanderers F.C. players
English Football League players
Association football goalkeepers